Jon Georg Balke (born 7 June 1955) is a Norwegian jazz pianist who leads the Magnetic North Orchestra. He is the younger brother of saxophonist Erik Balke.

Career 

Balke started playing classical piano but switched to blues at 12, though he performs within several genres. At the age of 18 he joined Arild Andersen's quartet. By the mid-1980s he worked on his own and would become one of Norway's leading jazz composers. He was active in the groups of Radka Toneff and in the Afrofusion group E'olén before joining Oslo 13 and Masqualero in the early 1980s. From 1989 he focused on his own projects, such as JøKleBa (with Audun Kleive and Per Jørgensen) and the Magnetic North Orchestra for which he composed the commissioned work Il Cenoneat to Vossajazz 1992.

Balke formed the percussion group Batagraf in 2002, and created the concept work Siwan with singer Amina Alaoui in 2007. He is also the creator of a series of multimedia concerts at Vossajazz festival, labeled Ekstremjazz. The concerts involve various practitioners of extreme sports, such as parachuting, paragliding, hanggliding, and BMX biking. In 2012 he was artist in residence at Moldejazz. In 2016 he launched the solo piano concept Warp the use of live electronics accompanying the grand piano in live performances.

Awards and honors 
1984: Buddyprisen
1993: Jazz Musician of the Year
2000: Edvard Prize in popular music – major works, for the album Solarized
2003: Oslo Bys kulturstipend
2008: Gammleng-prisen in the class jazz
2009* Jahrespreis der Deutschen Musikkritiker
2012: Artist in Residence at Moldejazz

Discography

As leader 
An asterisk (*) indicates year of release.

As co-leader
With Jøkleba
1991: On and On (Odin)
1993: JøKleBa! (Norsk Plateproduksjon)
1996: JøKleBa Live (Curling Legs)
2011: Nu Jøk? (EmArcy, Universal Music Norway)
2014: Outland (ECM)
2012: Magnetic Works 1993-2001 (ECM), compilation

With Batagraf
2005: Statements (ECM)
2011: Say and Play (ECM)
2016: On Anodyne (Grappa)
2018: Delights of Decay  (Jazzland)

As sideman 
With Radka Toneff
1979: It Don't Come Easy (PolyGram)
2008: Butterfly (Curling Legs), recorded 1976–77

With Masqualero
1983: Masqualero (Odin)
1985: Bande a Parte (ECM)

With Oslo 13
1983: Anti-Therapy (Odin)
1987: Off Balance (Odin)
1992: Nonsentration (ECM)
1994: Oslo 13 Live (Curling Legs)

With others
1975: Clouds in My Head (ECM), with Arild Andersen Quartet
1977: Hi-Fly (Compendium), with Karin Krog and Archie Shepp
1978: Høysang (NorDisc), with Lars Klevstrand and Guttorm Guttormsen Kvintett
1978: Club 7 jubileumsplate (Club 7), with Kråbøl and E'olén
1979: E'Olen (Mai), with E'Olen
1986: A Hip Hop (Dragon), with Göran Klinghagen
1991: Live at Rockefeller (Odin), with Jazzpunkensemblet
2002: Joko (ACT), with Miki N'Doye Orchestra feat. Paolo Vinaccia, Bugge Wesseltoft and Cissokho
2003: Trialogue (Imogena), with Lars Møller and Morten Lund - trio
2007: The Door (ECM), with Mathias Eick
2010: The Adventures of a Polar Expedition (Cowbell Music), with Hans Ulrik, Benjamin Koppel, Palle Danielsson and Alex Riel

See also

 List of jazz pianists

References

External links
 Official website
 Batagraf official site
 Siwan official site
 Balkes magnetiske univers

1955 births
Living people
Jazzland Recordings (1997) artists
20th-century Norwegian pianists
21st-century Norwegian pianists
Norwegian jazz pianists
Norwegian jazz composers
Musicians from Oslo
Post-bop pianists
ECM Records artists
Odin Records artists
Curling Legs artists
1300 Oslo members
Jazzpunkensemblet members
JøKleBa members
Masqualero members
Musicians from Furnes, Norway